Marjorie Estiano e Banda ao Vivo it is a DVD of Marjorie Estiano's first tour, recorded in São Paulo, in the Espaço LocAll.

Track listing
 Intro
 Miss Celies Blues (Sister) *
 So Easy 
 O Jogo 
 O Que Tiver Que Ser 
 Até o Fim *
 Tudo Passa 
 Cherish *
 Sem Direção 
 Parte de Você 
 You're So Beautiful *
 Versus Mudos 
 As Horas 
 Reflexo do Amor 
 This Love *
 Por Mais Que Eu Tente 
 Você Sempre Será

 * Denotes new songs that were not included in her debut album.

Bonus
 So Easy (Acoustic)
 Você Sempre Será (Acoustic)
 Você Sempre Será (Video)
 Photo gallery
 "Making of"

Sales

References

External links

Marjorie Estiano albums
2007 live albums
2007 video albums
Live video albums